Mont Veyrier is a mountain located in the French Alps, in Haute Savoie.

References

Mountains of the Alps
Mountains of Haute-Savoie